Antoine Quentin Fouquier de Tinville (10 June 17467 May 1795) was a French lawyer and public prosecutor during the French Revolution and Reign of Terror.

Biography

Early career
Born in Herouël, a village in the département of the Aisne, he was the son of a seigneurial landowner. For six years he studied law in Noyon and in 1774 purchased a position as prosecutor  procureur attached to the Châtelet in Paris.  He sold his office in 1781 to pay off his debts and became a clerk under the lieutenant-general of police. 

In early 1791 freedom of defence became the standard; any citizen was allowed to defend another. From the beginning, the authorities were concerned about this experiment's future. Derasse suggests it was a "collective suicide" by the lawyers in the Assembly.  In criminal cases, the expansion of the right ... gave priority to the spoken word. 

Little is known of the part he played at the outbreak of the Revolution. According to himself, he was part of the National Guard at its formation. He was active in the political committee of his section in 1789. In September 1791 former "advocates" lost their title, their distinctive form of dress, their status, and their profession orders and adapted their practices to the new political and legal situation. Also Fouquier called himself "homme de loi". In Summer 1792, he supported the sans-culottes movement. On 25 August, backed by his cousin Camille Desmoulins, and after Robespierre refused the position, Fouquier de Tinville became for three months the foreman of a jury established to pass verdicts on the crimes of enemies of the people arrested after the Insurrection of 10 August 1792.

Public prosecutor

When the Revolutionary Tribunal of Paris was created by the National Convention on 10 March 1793, and Fauré refused, Fouquier was appointed on 15 March as public accuser, an office that he filled from the end of the month until 1 August 1794. The documents were sent by the Committee of General Security to the public accuser, who examined them, summarized the facts, grouped the grievances, quoted the incriminating words or writings, and mentioned the denials of the accused. In a word, he drew up his indictment. Fouquier, like Maximilien Robespierre, was known for his ruthless radicalism. His zeal in prosecution earned him the nickname Purveyor to the Guillotine. On 29 July he accused Jacques-Bernard-Marie Montané, president of the tribunal, of being insufficiently radical. On 26 September 1793 Martial Herman was appointed as president and René-François Dumas as vice president; Coffinhal and Joachim Vilate were each appointed as one of the judges and jurors. 

Fouquier lived at Rue Saint-Honoré but moved to Place Dauphine and then to :fr:Quai de l'Horloge both on Île de la Cité. An apartment between the towers was the home of Fouquier-Tinville. He lived there with his wife and twins while conducting the trials in the courtroom.  His activity in the Conciergerie and the Palace of Justice earned him the reputation of one of the most sinister figures of the Revolution. His office as public accuser arguably reflected a need to display the appearance of legality during what was essentially political command, more than a need to establish actual guilt. 

Early April 1794 Fouquier-Tinville asked the tribunal to order the Indulgents who "confused the hearing" and insulted "National Justice" to the guillotine. The Dantonists were not serving the people. They had become false patriots, who had preferred personal and foreign interests to the welfare of the nation.

Grande Terreur
On 10 June Georges Couthon - a man of merciless fanaticism - introduced the drastic Law of 22 Prairial. Legal defense was sacrificed by banning any assistance for defendants brought before the revolutionary tribunal. "If this law passes," cried a deputy, "all we have to do is to blow our brains out." According to Fouquier-Tinville after Amar, Vadier proposed to change a few articles: The despotism of Robespierre made this project impossible to be carried out, for he wrested all the decrees he wanted. Fouquier, incapable to deal with the number of trials sent him a letter, but Robespierre didn't reply. Not long after the committee decided to organize batches of 50 people. The Tribunal became a simple court of condemnation refusing suspects the right of counsel and allowing only one of two verdicts – complete acquittal or death and that based not on evidence but on the moral conviction of the jurors. The courtroom was renovated to allow sixty people to be sentenced simultaneously. It proposed to erect a guillotine inside the courtroom, but it was moved to the Faubourg Saint-Antoine in order to stand out less.  According to François Furet, the prisons were overpopulated; they housed over 8,000 "suspects" at the beginning of Thermidor year II. The amount of death sentences doubled. Within three days, 156 people were sent in batches to the guillotine; all the members of the Parliament of Toulouse were executed. More than 2,400 people were convicted by the "tribunal révolutionaire" accused of conspiring against liberty. The commune had to solve serious problems in the cemeteries because of the smell. Mid-July two new mass graves were dug at Picpus Cemetery in the impermeable ground.  

One of the last groups he prosecuted included seven nuns, aged 32–66, of the former convent of Carmelites, living in Paris, plus an eighth nun, of the Convent of the Visitation,
. . .who were charged with consorting together and scheming to trouble the State by provoking civil war with their fanaticism...Instead of living at peace within the bosom of the Republic, which had provided for their subsistence, and instead of obeying the laws, adopted the idea of residing together in this same house...and of making this house a refuge for refractory priests and counter-revolutionary fanatics, with whom they plotted against the Revolution and against the eternal principles of liberty and equality which are its basis. 

Apparently, the nuns, whom he called criminal assassins, were corrupted by the ex-Jesuit Rousseau de Roseicquet, who led them in a conspiracy to poison minds and subvert the Republic.  When the judge read this piece of Fouquier-Tinville's prose, he condemned them to be deported, as well as all those who had given them refuge.

Downfall
On 26/27 June Robespierre demanded that Fouquier-Tinville, involved in the trial of Catherine Théot, be replaced as too bound to his eyes to the Committee of General Security. His career ended with the fall of Robespierre 9 Thermidor. In the evening also Fouquier-Tinville was invited to the Hôtel de Ville, where Robespierre and his supporters gathered, but he answered that he recognized the Convention alone. The next day, halfway through the proceedings, Fouquier-Tinville, who did not want to pass judgment on his friend the mayor Fleuriot-Lescot, took off his official robe and walked out. Although he was briefly kept as the new government's prosecutor being confirmed by Bertrand Barère de Vieuzac and the Convention on 28 July 1794, he was arrested after being denounced by Louis-Marie Stanislas Fréron as an accomplice of Robespierre.

Imprisoned on 1 August, he was brought to trial in front of the Convention. His defense was that he had only obeyed the decrees of the Committee of Public Safety and the Convention:
It is not I who ought to be facing the tribunal, but the chiefs whose orders I have executed. I had only acted in the spirit of the laws passed by a Convention invested with all powers. Through the absence of its members [on trial], I find myself the head of a [political] conspiracy I have never been aware of. Here I am facing slander, [facing] a people always eager to find others responsible.

After a trial lasting forty-one days, he was sentenced to death and guillotined on 7 May 1795, together with 15 former functionaries of the Revolutionary Tribunal, who were sentenced as his accomplices.

Personal life

In 1775 Fouquier-Tinville married Geneviève-Dorothée Saugnier, his cousin, with whom he would have five children (two twins). He was widowed seven years later. Four months after his wife's death, he remarried Henriette Jeanne Gérard d'Arcourt, with whom he would spend the rest of his life. They had three children together.

Victims
 Charlotte Corday
 Adam Philippe, Comte de Custine and his son,
 Marie Antoinette
 Girondist
Jacques Pierre Brissot and 21 Girondins
Madame Roland
 Olympe de Gouges
 Mme du Barry
 Antoine Barnave
 Armand Louis de Gontaut, duc de Lauzun, later duc de Biron
 Jacques Hébert as well as the leaders of the "armées révolutionnaires" were denounced by the Revolutionary Tribunal as accomplices of Hébert.
 Dantonists. 
George Danton 
Marie Jean Hérault de Séchelles
Pierre Philippeaux
Camille and Lucile Desmoulins
 On 22 April Malesherbes, a lawyer who had defended the king and the deputés Isaac René Guy le Chapelier and Jacques Guillaume Thouret, four times elected president of the Constituent Assembly were taken to the scaffold. 
 Cécile Renault
 Élisabeth of France
 Alexandre de Beauharnais 
 André Chénier
 Martyrs of Compiègne
 Princess of Monaco
 Maximilien Robespierre and 21 "Robespierrists" on 29 July 1794. The next day about half of the Paris Commune (70 members) were sent to the guillotine; Fouquier didn't sign the document. On the following day, twelve members of theConseil Général de la Commune were sent to the guillotine. The Revolutionary Tribunal was suspended and replaced by a temporary commission.

Fiction and film 
Fouquier was played by Roger Planchon in Andrzej Wajda's film Danton (1983).
He appears as a character in the opera Andrea Chenier by Umberto Giordano.
 Tinville appears in the game We. The Revolution where he aids the player as a prosecutor for the Revolutionary Tribunal during the Reign of Terror.

Sources

References 
 In turn, it cites as references:
 Mémoire pour A. Q. Fouquier ex-accusateur public près le tribunal révolutionnaire, etc. (Paris, 1794)
 M. Domenget, Fouquier-Tinville et le tribunal révolutionnaire (Paris, 1878)
 Georges Lecocq, Notes et documents sur Fouquier-Tinville (Paris, 1885)
 Jean Maurice Tourneux, Bibliographie de l'histoire de Paris pendant la Révolution Française, vol. i. Nos. 4445-4454 (1890), an ennumeration of the documents relating to Fouquier-Tinville's trial
 Henri Wallon, Histoire du tribunal révolutionnaire de Paris (1880–1882)

Further reading
 THE PUBLIC PROSECUTOR : : OF THE TERROR : : ANTOINE QUENTIN FOUQUIER-TINVILLE TRANSLATED FROM THE FRENCH OF ALPHONSE J. DUNOYER BY A.W. EVANS WITH A PHOTOGRAVURE FRONTISPIECE AND FOURTEEN OTHER ILLUSTRATIONS
 Le glaive vengeur de la République française une et indivisible, ou, Galerie révolutionnaire : contenant les noms, prénoms, les lieux de naissance, l'état, les ci-devant qualités, l'âge, les crimes et les dernières paroles de tous les grands conspirateurs et traîtres à la patrie, dont la tête est tombé sous le glaive national, par arrêt du Tribunal extraordinaire, établi à Paris par une loi en date du 10 mars 1793, pour juger sans appel de ce genre de délit / by Dulac, H. G.

External links 

1746 births
1795 deaths
People from Aisne
French people executed by guillotine during the French Revolution
Prosecutors
Jacobins
People of the Reign of Terror
18th-century French lawyers